Pappin is a surname, and may refer to:

 Jim Pappin (born 1939) - retired professional ice hockey right winger
 Veryan Pappin (born 1958) - former Scottish field hockey player

Some claim that Pappin is a common surname from Pikwàkanagàn, however this information is inaccurate.

See also

 Papin
 Pippin (disambiguation)

English-language surnames